Belgium is a country in Europe. 

Belgium may also refer to:

History:
United States of Belgium, an antecedent to modern Belgium

Places:
Belgium, Illinois, United States
Belgium, West Virginia, United States
Belgium, Wisconsin, United States
Belgium (town), Wisconsin, United States
Belgium Township, Polk County, Minnesota, United States

Other:
"Belgium", a song by Bowling for Soup
A fictional curse word in The Hitchhiker's Guide to the Galaxy
SS Belgique, one of the names of the ship SS Hoxie
Belgium, a temporary renaming of the Belgian beer brand Jupiler in support of the Belgium national football team at the 2018 FIFA World Cup
Belgium, an alternate name for Devon (sausage)

See also
Belgian (disambiguation)
Belgaum